National Highway 748AA, commonly referred to as NH 748AA is a national highway in India. It is a spur road of National Highway 48.  NH-748AA traverses the states of Karnataka and Goa in India.

Route 
Karnataka
Machhe, Piranvadi, Navage, Kinaye, Kusamalli, Jamboti, Kalmani, Kankumbi - Goa border.

Goa
Karnataka border - Poriem, Matnee, Sanquelim.

Junctions  
 
  Terminal near Sankeshwar.

See also 
 List of National Highways in India
 List of National Highways in India by state

References

External links 

 NH 748AA on OpenStreetMap

National highways in India
National Highways in Karnataka
National Highways in Goa